Tetraplodon is a genus of mosses belonging to the family Splachnaceae.

The genus has cosmopolitan distribution.

Species:

Tetraplodon angustatus 
Tetraplodon blyttii 
Tetraplodon bryoides 
Tetraplodon caulescens 
Tetraplodon fuegianus 
Tetraplodon itatiaiae 
Tetraplodon mnioides 
Tetraplodon pallidus 
Tetraplodon paradoxus 
Tetraplodon stenophysatus 
Tetraplodon tomentosus 
Tetraplodon urceolatus

References

Splachnales
Moss genera